"Dreamin'" is a song written by Lisa Montgomery and Geneva Paschal and originally performed by the family group Guinn in 1986.

Vanessa Williams recording
In 1988, American singer and actress Vanessa Williams recorded the song and released it as the third single from her debut studio album, The Right Stuff (1988). In the United States, the single was Williams' first top 40, and first number-one hit on the Billboard R&B chart, where it stayed at the top of the chart for two weeks. On the Billboard Hot 100 pop chart, "Dreamin'" peaked at number eight. 
Elsewhere, "Dreamin'" reached number 74 on the UK Singles Chart, number 40 in the Netherlands, and number 19 in New Zealand.

Track listings
European CD single
"Dreamin'" (Album Version) – 5:25 	
"Dreamin'" (Instrumental) – 5:25 	
"The Right Stuff" (Album Version) – 4:18

Personnel
 Vanessa Williams – lead and background vocals	
 Rachelle Ferrell, Carol Coleman, Lori Fulton – background vocals
 Donald Robinson – producer, keyboards, mixing, arrangements
 Randy Bowland – guitar
 Jim Salamone – drum programming
 Daryl Burgee – percussion
 Ron Kerber – saxophone
 Mike Tarsia – engineering, mixing
 Adam Silverman – assistant engineer
 Ronald Distasio – assistant engineer

Charts

Weekly charts

Year-end charts

References

1980s ballads
1986 songs
1988 singles
Contemporary R&B ballads
Music videos directed by Alek Keshishian
Smooth jazz songs
Songs about dreams
Soul ballads
Vanessa Williams songs
Wing Records singles